Sister Vision Press was a Canadian small press publisher that operated from 1985 to 2001, 
and was the first press in Canada whose mission was to publish writing by and for women of colour.

History

In 1985, writer Makeda Silvera and her partner, visual artist Stephanie Martin, 
co-founded Sister Vision Press with Martin as the production manager and Silvera as the managing editor.

Silvera had struggled to have her book Silenced: Caribbean Domestic Workers Talk With Makeda Silvera published by both mainstream and alternative publishers, such as Women's Press (Toronto),  
on the basis that the language was inaccessible and too difficult to understand, and that there was no market for such a book.  (The book was eventually published by Williams-Wallace Publishers in 1986, and Sister Vision Press obtained the rights in 1989.)

This rejection fueled Silvera and Martin's commitment to starting their own press "for Black women and women of colour, one that addressed working-class issues and concerns, that addressed sexuality and language with an emphasis on Creole." Obstacles included having little to no funding, a lack of public support and awareness for a publishing company for women of colour, and hesitation from the black literary community to stand behind a black lesbian couple. Some of their inspirations were Marie Joseph Angelique, a Montreal slave who spearheaded the first rebellion against slavery in Canada, and Mary Ann Shadd, the first Canadian female editor and publisher of The Provincial Freeman, "one of Canada's earliest Black newspapers" in the 1850s. Silvera and Martin's goals through the Sister Vision Press were to bring awareness about the links "between women and colour in Canada and in the Caribbean and Third World women the world over".

Editorial focus

Sister Vision Press focused on works that included oral histories of "ordinary women often omitted from traditional history and contemporary writing", books for children and young adults, and lastly works of theory and research that "oppose the negation of women of colour's voices in Canadian feminist theory and movements".

Much of their success was in publishing anthologies like Piece of My Heart: A Lesbian of Colour Anthology, which was a finalist in the American Library Association Gay and Lesbian Book Award for 1992. Memories Have Tongue, a 1992 book by Afua Cooper, was one of the finalists in the 1992 Casa de las Americas literary award.

After its establishment, Sister Vision Press collaborated with feminist women's organizations in the Caribbean, Britain, Southern Africa, India and North America. One of these partnerships was with CAFRA (Caribbean Association for Feminist Research and Action) of Trinidad and Tobago and it resulted in the publishing of Creation Fire: A CAFRA Anthology of Caribbean Women Poets (1990), edited by Ramabai Espinet. Silvera also sought out other writers, noting "A lot of writers that we encountered just didn't have the confidence to put out their work or to see their names in print. As the managing editor, I took on the role of mentoring many writers, particularly first-timers, through community centres, through word of mouth, and by offering workshops."

Partial list of books published

 Speshal rikwes [Poems in Dialect], Ahdri Zhina Mandiela (1985)
 Lionheart Gal: Life Stories of Jamaican Women, ed. Sistren Theatre Collective and Honor Ford-Smith (1986)
 Blaze a Fire: Significant Contributions of Caribbean Women, ed. Nesha Hanif (1988)
 Creation Fire: A CAFRA Anthology of Caribbean Women Poets, ed. Ramabai Espinet (1990)
 Piece of My Heart: A Lesbian of Colour Anthology, ed. Makeda Silvera (1991)
 Memories Have Tongue, Afua Cooper (1992)
 Returning the Gaze : Essays on Racism, Feminism and Politics, ed. Himani Bannerji (1993)
 Ladies of the Night and Other Stories, Althea Prince (1993)
 Miscegenation Blues: Voices of Mixed Race Women, ed. Carol Camper (1994)
 The Very Inside: An Anthology of Writings by Asian and Pacific Island Lesbians and Bisexual Women, ed. Sharon Lim-Hing (1994)
 Onkwehonwe-neha: "Our Ways", Sylvia Maracle (1994)
 Dread Culture : A Rastawoman's Story, Masanie Montague (1994)
 Black Girl Talk, ed. the Black Girls (1995)

References

Book publishing companies of Canada
Feminist book publishing companies